Anju Nakamura (Nakamura Anju; born 23 January 2000) is a Japanese Nordic combined skier.

Career
Competing in the 2020–21 FIS Nordic Combined World Cup, Nakamura placed 3rd overall. She competed at the FIS Nordic World Ski Championships 2021, where she placed fourth in women's individual normal hill/5 km. She won bronze medals at the 2019 and 2020 Nordic Junior World Ski Championships.

Nordic combined results
All results are sourced from the International Ski Federation (FIS).

World Championships
 0 medal

World Cup

Season standings

References

External links

2000 births
Living people
Japanese female Nordic combined skiers
Sportspeople from Sapporo
21st-century Japanese women